Tånnander is a Swedish surname. Notable people with the surname include:

Annette Tånnander (born 1958), Swedish Olympic heptathlete, daughter of Kjell
Kjell Tånnander (born 25 June 1927), Swedish Olympic decathlete
Kristine Tånnander  (born 1955), Swedish Olympic heptathlete, daughter of Kjell

Swedish-language surnames